Dwinger may refer to:
Edwin Erich Dwinger (1898-1981), Russian-German novelist and SS-Obersturmführer; Wilhelm Wien's son-in-law 
Ida Dwinger, Danish actress
Max Dwinger (fencer born 1870) (1870-1939), Dutch fencer
Max Dwinger (fencer born 1943), Dutch fencer, grandson of the above